Hudgi  is a village in the northern Karnataka, India. It is located in the Homnabad taluk of Bidar district.

Demographics
 India census, Hudgi had a population of 9000 with 4580 males and 4420 females.

See also
 Bidar
 Districts of Karnataka

References

External links
 http://Bidar.nic.in/

Villages in Bidar district